New York held elections with the rest of the country on November 5, 2002

Because it did not grow as fast as other states, New York lost 2 Congressional seats because of Congressional apportionment following the Census. In the redistricting process, the parties agreed to eliminate one seat from each party, and do a pro-incumbent gerrymander.

This did not work out as planned in the 1st district, where incumbent Republican Felix Grucci ran an ad claiming that his opponent, Democrat Timothy Bishop, was soft on rapists. This backfired, and Bishop won in an upset. After the 2006 elections, only 6 of the 11 districts that had been gerrymandered to be Republican were still in Republican control.

Delegation Composition

New York lost 2 seats following congressional apportionment.

Results

New York
2002
United States House of Representatives elections in New York